Toéssin, Bam may refer to:

Toéssin, Rollo, Burkina Faso
Toéssin, Zimtenga, Burkina Faso